Pointon is a small village situated  north of Bourne, in the South Kesteven district of Lincolnshire, England. It forms part of the civil parish of Pointon and Sempringham which had a 2021 population of 533. The majority of the parish's population live in Pointon.

Pointon is part of the ecclesiastical parish of Pointon and Sempringham. Christchurch, in Pinfold Lane, Pointon, is a 'tin tabernacle' of wood and corrugated iron; it was erected in 1893 as a chapel of ease. The parish church, dedicated to Saint Andrew, is in Sempringham. In 1885, a Kelly's Directory noted Pointon as being in the then parish of Sempringham-cum-Pointon and Birthorpe, with St Andrew's church "situated on an eminence, overlooking the Fen district, about half a mile from any residence now existing". A 1916 Lincolnshire guidebook noted: "The parish church (St Andrew) stands on a hill nearly 1 m. from its principal hamlet of Pointon". 

St Gilbert of Sempringham C of E Primary School, on West Road, dates from 1863.

References

External links

Villages in Lincolnshire
South Kesteven District